Natalya Klimova (born 31 May 1951) is a Ukrainian former basketball player who competed in the 1976 Summer Olympics. She was born in Mariupol and played for Dynamo Kyiv.

References

1951 births
Living people
Sportspeople from Mariupol
Ukrainian women's basketball players
Olympic basketball players of the Soviet Union
Basketball players at the 1976 Summer Olympics
Olympic gold medalists for the Soviet Union
Olympic medalists in basketball
Soviet women's basketball players
Medalists at the 1976 Summer Olympics
Honoured Masters of Sport of the USSR
Dynamo sports society athletes